The United States Junior Open Squash Championship is the largest individual junior squash tournament in the world  and is considered the third most prestigious junior open squash championship after the World Junior and the British Junior Open squash championship. It is just one of just five Tier 2 events used in the WSF World Junior Squash Circuit.

The US Junior Open has shifted around locations in recent years due to efforts to secure the large amount of courts required to hold such a big tournament because multiple venues, usually four, host the tournament. It was held in Seattle in 2007, then Trinity College and surrounding schools in Hartford in 2008 and 2009, then Harvard University and surrounding schools in Boston from 2010 to 2012. Since then, every year it has been held primarily at Yale University in New Haven, Trinity College, and other schools in the Connecticut area. The coming tournament in 2018 will now be held at Harvard and the Boston area.

The 2014 US Junior Open squash championship hosted a record field of over 900 players representing over 20 countries.

The tournament is divided into ten categories — Boys Under-19, Boys Under-17, Boys Under-15, Boys Under-13, Boys Under-11, Girls Under-19, Girls Under-17, Girls Under-15, Girls Under-13, and Girls Under-11.

List of winners by category (Boys) since 1999

Boys' champions by country since 1999

List of winners by category (Girls) since 1999

Girls' champions by country since 1999

See also
 US Open
 World Junior Squash Circuit
 World Junior Squash Championships
 British Junior Open Squash
 French Junior Open Squash
 Dutch Junior Open Squash
 U.S. Squash

References

External links
US Junior Open 2005

Squash tournaments in the United States
Squash records and statistics
Youth sport in the United States
Squash in the United States
Squash in Connecticut